The 1922–23 Torquay United F.C. season was Torquay United's second season in competitive football and their first season in the Southern League.  The season runs from 1 July 1922 to 30 June 1923.

Overview
After a creditable first season of competitive football in the Western League, Torquay United applied a second time to enter the Southern League and were this time successful. Naturally entering the English Section, the League consisted mainly of reserve teams from Football League sides, as well as a handful of other professional clubs such as Boscombe and their old Western League rivals Yeovil & Petters United.  Although Torquay made an inconsistent start to life in the Southern League, they soon picked up the pace as the season wore on.  Finishing strongly and losing just one of their last ten games, United ended the season in a respectable 6th place.

As the second highest placed non-reserve side, Torquay United now felt confident enough to apply for election to the Football League.  However, United's bid was unsuccessful and the club did not even receive a single vote in the ballot. Having failed in their attempt at election to the Third Division South, Torquay would have to settle for a second season in the Southern League although, due to restructuring, they would now be taking their place in the newly created Western Section.

Competitions

Southern League English Section

Standings

Matches

FA Cup

Devon Professional Cup

References

External links

Torquay United
Torquay United F.C. seasons